Orient is an annual music festival held in the Baltic countries concentrating on Asian music, the main focus being on folk, sacred, and traditional classical music. The festival has featured Oriental musicians such as Indian flautist Pandit Hariprasad Chaurasia, sitarists Pandit Ravi Shankar and Anoushka Shankar, the Japanese giant drum ensemble "Kodô", the Tuvinian guttural singers "Huun-Huur-Tu", Tibetan Buddhists monks of Gyuto and Gyume monasteries, the Turkish percussionist Burhan Öçal, the Armenian dudukist Jivan Gasparyan, and the Azeri muqam singer Alim Qasimov.

References

 Remme, Anneli, Unenägudeta vares lootoseõiel. Asja Armastaja mõtteid ida muusika festivalist "Orient", in Teater. Muusika. Kino (Tallinn, Estonia, June 2005)

External links
 Official website

Folk festivals in Estonia
Hindustani classical music festivals
Carnatic classical music festivals
World music festivals
Folk festivals in Latvia
Folk festivals in Finland
Folk festivals in Sweden
Folk festivals in Russia
Music festivals established in 1992